Aphylla is a widespread Neotropical genus of dragonflies of the Gomphidae family. They are commonly known as the greater forceptails because of their forceps-like cerci.

The genus contains the following species:

References 

Gomphidae
Anisoptera genera
Taxa named by Edmond de Sélys Longchamps
Taxobox binomials not recognized by IUCN